Stephanostomum baccatum is a species of parasitic flatworms in the family Acanthocolpidae.

S. baccatum is a marine hermaphroditic endoparasite that feeds on its host. Larval stages have been found in the digestive gland of Buccinum undatum.

Distribution 
The distribution of S. baccatum includes:
 Southern Gaspé waters (Baie des Chaleurs, Gaspe Bay to American, Orphan and Bradelle banks; eastern boundary: Eastern Bradelle Valley)
 Prince Edward Island (from the northern tip of Miscou Island, N.B., to Cape Breton Island south of Cheticamp, including the Northumberland Strait and Georges Bay to the Canso Strait causeway)
 Laurentian Channel (bathyal zone)(Esquiman Channel),
 The lower Laurentian Channel (bathyal zone as far as Cabot Strait; Cape North, N.S., St. Paul Island to Cape Ray, NL).

References 

This article incorporates CC-BY-SA-3.0 text from the reference.

Animals described in 1907
Plagiorchiida
Parasitic helminths of fish
Endoparasites